The British Rail Class 376 are electric multiple unit passenger trains manufactured by Bombardier Transportation at its Derby Litchurch Lane Works. It is part of the Electrostar family, which are the most common EMUs introduced since the privatisation of British Rail. The units were ordered by Connex South Eastern, introduced in 2004/2005 by South Eastern Trains originally to replace Class 465 and Class 466 to be transferred to the Outer Suburban services to Kent to replace the Class 423 slam-door trains.

Design

It is a derivative of the Class 375 Electrostar specially designed for use on the high-volume metro routes running from Central London, and through Southeast London to Kent. The changes are mostly focused on increasing the trains’ capacity and decreasing station dwell times. The Class 376's doors are wider to allow more passengers to board at once, and are metro-style sliding pocket doors which are faster and more reliable than the Class 375s plug doors, although they do not close flush with the bodyside and hence are less aerodynamic and do not provide as much thermal insulation. The units have 2 sets of double doors per side in each carriage. Also, these trains do not have air conditioning, with hopper style windows available for ventilation. In order to provide more standing room, the trains also have fewer seats, more handrails, and no on-board toilets (South Eastern promised to provide additional facilities in their stations to compensate) and, as a consequence, these trains are limited to in-service journey times of 1 hour.

Class 376 units have five coaches, and unlike the Class 375, they have full-width cabs instead of gangways at the ends of the train; as a result, it is not possible to walk between two coupled Class 376 units. The cab front is also smooth and ‘step free’ to reduce the dangerous problem of train surfing in Southeast London.

Like all new trains in the United Kingdom using third rail power, one carriage in each unit has a recess in its roof where a pantograph can be fitted, so as to allow for future conversion to overhead AC traction power and/or make the unit dual voltage.

Maintenance
All Class 376 trains were allocated to Slade Green depot, but due to the high volume of work there, these trains are sent to Ramsgate for routine maintenance.

Fleet details

Accidents and incidents
A train formed by units 376 002 and 376 035 was one of eleven trains that stalled and became stranded in the Lewisham area on 2 March 2018. Passengers self-evacuated the train after conditions on board became intolerable due to lack of heating, toilets and communication. 

On 10 July 2018, 376 030 partially derailed at Grove Park depot.

See also 
 Bombardier Electrostar
 British Rail Class 378

References

External links

376
Bombardier Transportation multiple units
Train-related introductions in 2004
750 V DC multiple units